Nguyễn Văn Duyến, art name Tú Duyên (20 December 1915, in Bát Tràng, Bắc Ninh – May 3, 2012) was a Vietnamese painter.

Nguyễn Văn Duyến was born in the pottery village of Bát Tràng near Hanoi. He first was a private student of Nam Sơn, then a student at the École des Beaux-Arts de l'Indochine from 1935-1942.

Duyên moved to Saigon in 1942, making silk and paper Đông Hồ folk prints from finger-painted woodblocks. His work is considered as having given new dimensions to traditional thủ ấn họa hand stamp paintings. He submitted some of his prints to Saigon's newspapers and his illustrations began to feature in newspapers from the late 1940s. His paintings drew subjects from literary work such as Truyện Kiều, the Chinh phụ ngâm of the poet Đặng Trần Côn, and popular  folklore. He had also drawn Vietnamese kings and other notable historical figures.
The Ho Chi Minh City Museum of Fine Arts currently exhibits his work including nine paintings on canvas and 52 wood carving plaques

References

External links
 Họa sĩ Tú Duyên qua đời - Painter Tú Duyên passes away (Vietnamese) Article and photo
 Họa sĩ Tú Duyên - Trọn đời đam mê thủ ấn họa - Article with examples of Tú Duyên's thủ ấn họa style of painting

Vietnamese painters
1915 births
2012 deaths